21 Squadron or 21st Squadron may refer to:

 No. 21 Squadron RAAF, Royal Australian Air Force
 No. 21 Squadron (Finland), Finnish Air Force
 21 Squadron SAAF, South African Air Force
 No. 21 Squadron RAF, United Kingdom Royal Air Force
 21st Aeromedical Evacuation Squadron, United States Air Force
 21st Airlift Squadron, United States Air Force
 21st Bombardment Squadron, United States Air Force
 21st Fighter Squadron, United States Air Force
 21st Operational Weather Squadron,  United States Air Force
 21st Photographic Reconnaissance Squadron, United States Air Force
 21st Pursuit Squadron, United States Army Air Force
 21st Space Operations Squadron, United States Air Force
 21st Special Operations Squadron, United States Air Force
 21st Tactical Air Support Squadron, United States Air Force

See also 
 21st Brigade (disambiguation)
 21st Regiment (disambiguation)